Marc Martin Lamti (born 28 January 2001) is a footballer who plays as a defender. Born in Germany, he represents Tunisia national football team internationally.

International career
Lamti made his debut for Tunisia national football team on 7 June 2019 in a friendly against Iraq, as an 81st-minute substitute for Ellyes Skhiri. He was later included in the squad for 2019 Africa Cup of Nations.

Career statistics

International

Honours
Tunisia
Africa Cup of Nations 4th place: 2019

References

External links
 
 

Living people
2001 births
Footballers from Cologne
Association football defenders
Tunisian footballers
Tunisia international footballers
German footballers
German people of Tunisian descent
2019 Africa Cup of Nations players
Bayer 04 Leverkusen players
Hannover 96 II players
Hannover 96 players